Salt water, saltwater, or saline water is water containing salt.

Salt water or saltwater may also refer to:

Fluids
Seawater, water from our oceans
Saline (medicine), medical usage of saline solution

Film
 Saltwater (2000 film), a 2000 film by Conor McPherson
 Saltwater (2012 film), a 2012 film by Charlie Vaughn

Music
 Saltwater, an alias of the German trance group Alphazone
 "Saltwater" (Chicane song), 1999
 "Saltwater" (Julian Lennon song), 1991
 "Salt Water", a song by A Hawk and a Hacksaw from The Way the Wind Blows
 "Salt Water", a song by Blackfield from Blackfield V
 "Salt Water", a song by Don Johnson Big Band from Breaking Daylight
 "Salt Water", a song by The The from NakedSelf
 Saltwater, an EP by Pianos Become the Teeth
 Saltwater, an album by Dan Michaelson and The Coastguards
 "Saltwater", a song by The Cat Empire from Two Shoes

See also
 Saltwater people(s)